The Bleed Like Me Tour  was the fourth world concert tour cycle by American/Scottish alternative rock group Garbage. The tour launched in Paris, France and took the band throughout North America, Europe and Australia in support of the band's fourth studio album Bleed Like Me which was released internationally in April 2005.  The tour took in combinations of headline performances, slots on the bills at rock festivals, television and radio shows. After being initially organised low-key, the tour snowballed into bigger venues when the parent album and its lead single "Why Do You Love Me" became surprise hits internationally. The tour concluded in Perth, Western Australia after six months on the road; when the tour leg of dates in France, Belgium and United Kingdom were cancelled. A press statement from the band stated that they had "somewhat overextended themselves".

Former Janes Addiction bassist Eric Avery left his position as a member of Alanis Morissette's backing band to perform bass guitar for the duration of the tour. Matt Walker, who had performed on the Bleed Like Me album, covered on drums on a small number of North American shows. Walker had also covered for the band on a previous tour. A number of artists supported Garbage throughout the run of the tour, including The Dead 60's, JJ72, Los Abandoned, Melatonine, Silo, Red Jezebel and theSTART. During one festival appearance, Garbage performed four mash ups with Canadian electroclash musician Peaches.

Each performance on the tour was led-in by an intro-tape of Johnny Cash's posthumous cover version "Hurt". The first three legs of the tour were documented by a film crew, which was hosted as streaming video on the band's website, and as extra content on their single and album releases. More of the footage was later incorporated into a full-length documentary, Thanks for the Uhhh, Support, which was released on the band's 2007 greatest hits DVD.

Tour itinerary
Garbage began a three-week promotional tour of Europe from March 19, during which time Garbage performed live tracks on various television and radio shows, prior to performing two warm-up headline club shows in Paris (supported by local group Melatonine) and in London. The band then travelled to Germany to perform at WDR's Rochnacht televised concert, and also performed a full set for broadcast on Radio Fritz. A brief North American tour of theaters and clubs was scheduled to begin in Seattle on April 8 and end May 4 in Chicago; however the band had picked up an influenza infection while in Europe and cancelled the first show. The tour then restarted in San Francisco, heading down the Pacific coast and over to the Eastern Seaboard. The band then played two shows in Canada and then headed around the Midwest. The North American leg was eventually extended, ending on May 10 in Cleveland. Garbage then performed on the bill at the HFStival in Baltimore. For the band's Atlanta show, local radio station 99x offered a competition prize of being Garbage's tour manager for the day, including traveling with Garbage from the hotel to the venue and participating in their soundcheck.

Garbage returned to Europe to perform for on the bills of numerous rock festivals across the continent over six weeks, kicking of on June 1 in Denmark. During the run the band performed a few headline shows, such as a single date at London's Brixton Academy and at Barcelona's Razzmatazz. The band dedicated their Glastonbury performance of "Right Between the Eyes" to Australian singer Kylie Minogue who'd had to cancel her appearance on the same night after being diagnosed with breast cancer. The run ended in Austria on July 15. Garbage returned to the United States to perform at a few festivals, and made a three-date trek into Mexico where they were supported by local act Los Abandoned, and performed an entire set in a TV studio for the series SoundStage. Garbage began a four-week series of shows on August 22 in Chicago with California new wave band TheStart in support. The routing took the tour into a number of Canadian provinces, and then back south down the American west coast. The headline shows ended in Las Vegas on September 15.

 Garbage performed at one last North American show, for KROQ's Inland Invasion festival before heading to Australia to perform seven shows at the end of that month with indie rock band Red Jezebel in support. The final show in Perth on October 1 marked the end of the Bleed Like Me tour. A set of European concerts were announced for October, and subsequently cancelled.

Garbage disbanded at the end of the tour for an indefinite "hiatus". Manson told the press: "We feel that this has been a really great tour and we feel that we have really muscled through... we just want to take some time off while things are really good between us". Rumours abounded that the band had split, but Manson reassured that they were not interested in breaking up. Garbage spent the following five years inactive, aside from playing a short set at a Los Angeles benefit concert, sporadic recording in 2007 for a greatest hits compilation and in 2008 for a charity tribute album. The "hiatus" ended with an official reformation in 2010.

Tour production

Rehearsals for the Bleed Like Me tour took place during February and March 2005. Pre-production tasks included sourcing and programming the sounds and samples from Bleed Like Me into the band's samplers, synths and drum triggers and configuring settings for three sets of control gear and backline racks. Slightly different arrangements of older songs were composed, particularly for the intro section of "Only Happy When it Rains", the middle 8 of "Supervixen" and the codas of both "#1 Crush" and "Shut Your Mouth". Due to having limited rehearsal time, Garbage were only able to prepare an initial setlist of around fifteen songs.

Garbage operated a "quiet stage" by removing wedges, side-fills and live backline from their stage set-up. The absence of monitors meant zero stage volume – if the P.A. was switched off the only audible elements would be Manson's voice and the cymbals; and no monitor volume – instead, the band utilised Sennheiser IEMs to monitor their live sound. The use of digital technology in the band's in-ear mixes and F.O.H. mix meant that instead of a multitude of manual settings needing restored at each soundcheck, the band's FOH and monitor engineers only had to recall the last session from the previous night. Each performance was recorded in the DSD format by taking a data dump from the mixing console at 24-bit/48k and saving the wave file onto disc for future reference.

Drum triggers were used extensively because Butch Vig's drum kits are silenced by filling the hollow interiors of the bass, snares and tom-toms with packing chips to enable the samplers to use drum sounds from studio versions. The cymbals were miked to capture their sound. To prevent the sound of the cymbals bleeding into Shirley Manson's vocal feed, the cymbals were insulated by a wrap-wround acrylic glass shield. To keep the stage lead-free, all electric and bass guitars sported wireless units. Guitar sounds were run through effects units direct to the soundboard; Manson also used a wireless mic. The band had performed in this fashion since the start of the Version 2.0 tour.

Stage lighting was dictated by low budget, using in-house lighting rigs for four different coloured backwashes and two frontwashes (a no-colour and a red wash). The audience were also kept fairly well-lit in an effort to bring the audience closer to the band onstage. The show opening was notable for using very little light, matching the intro-tape of "Hurt" and the band's "Queer" to give a soft and gentle but ominous feel to the proceedings. The band's stage backdrop featured a low-resolution LED curtain supported by four 40" high-resolution plasma TV screens. Some of the footage was manipulated from the hardware's media server, while some content was provided by music video director Sophie Muller for specific songs, including close-ups of Manson's eyes for "Why Do You Love Me".

Road crew on the Bleed Like Me tour included: production manager/lighting tech Butch Allen, FOH engineer Tom Abraham, monitor engineer Clay Hutson, drum technician Chad Zaemisch and guitar tech Billy Bush. Shows were booked by Jenna Adler at Creative Artists Agency, while the band's tour management was overseen by Gayle Fine of Q Prime.

Opening acts

The Dead 60's (North America – Leg 1)
Los Abandoned (Mexico)
TheStart (North America – Leg 3)
Silo and Red Jezebel (Australia)

Setlists

Tour dates

Cancellations and rescheduled shows

Notes

a Butch Vig was absent from this concert due to the death of his mother; he was replaced by Matt Walker.

Promotional performances
Garbage performed on a number of TV shows and radio stations during the tour to promote Bleed Like Me and its singles. While some were fully set up live band performances, a number of them were lipsynched when the host studios were not able to accommodate the band's live equipment. One televised event, T4 on the Beach was a three-hour UK-televised concert featuring a multitude of current bands and pop artists performing short sets on the Weston-super-Mare beachfront: due to the quick turnaround time of the event, each act had to lipsynch their tracks. Later, in Trieste, Italy, Garbage performed a full live six-song set for Isle of MTV in the city's Piazza Unità d'Italia, this show was broadcast across the continent. In late August, Garbage performed a full-length live show at WTTW Studios, Chicago in front of a studio audience for the series Soundstage. The show aired on PBS stations a year later on July 6, 2006.

Critical reception

Garbage's performance on the Bleed Like Me tour met with a mostly-positive appraisal from music critics; some gave a more favourable reception to their shows – and Shirley Manson's stage presence and persona – than they did for the album. Reviewing Garbage's "comeback" show at London's Scala, Catherine Yates of Kerrang!, felt that "[the band] are still finding their feet after so long away" but noted that with their backcatologue that "when they chose to, this is a band who can crush a crowd". A week later, Kelefa Sanneh of The New York Times praised Manson's "appealingly feline performance" but was not positive about the band's new material. In a review of their Brixton Academy concert for The Guardian, Ian Gittins wrote "Garbage's motor has long been the chippy insecurity of singer Shirley Manson, and the dexterity with which they translate this neurosis into in-your-face defiance. This defiance was plentiful in Brixton, where lukewarm reviews for their latest album did not stop the resurgent group scorching through a fiery and frequently inspirational set". XFM's John Ford wrote of the band's Glastonbury performance "a revitalised Garbage pummel the Pyramid Stage as the sun goes down. [There was] a bizarre moment where Manson was actually dry humping a full-size latex sex doll. Weird, captivating and down-right good fun."

References

External links
 Garbage official website
 Garbage setlist archive
 Bleed Like Me tour box: 03, 04, 05, 06/07, 2005

2005 concert tours
Garbage (band) concert tours